KFLN (960 AM, "960 KFLN") is a radio station licensed to serve Baker, Montana. The station is owned by Jay B. Newell, through licensee Newell Media, LLC. It airs a country music format.

The station shares studios with sister KJJM (FM), at 3584 Highway 7, north of Baker, Montana. The transmitter is also here.

The station was assigned the KFLN call letters by the Federal Communications Commission.

References

External links
KFLN official website

FLN
Country radio stations in the United States
Fallon County, Montana